Bader is an unincorporated community in Schuyler County, Illinois, United States. The community was founded in 1870 under the name Osceola; it was later renamed after William Bader, who ran a grain elevator in the community. A post office opened in the community on October 8, 1872, under the name Baders; it was shortened to Bader on December 23, 1907.

Notable people

Evangelist Jesse Moren Bader (1886-1963) was born in Bader.
MLB pitcher Lore Bader (1888-1973), who played for the New York Giants and Philadelphia Phillies, was born in Bader.

References

Unincorporated communities in Schuyler County, Illinois
Unincorporated communities in Illinois
Populated places established in 1870
1870 establishments in Illinois